Styal railway station is near Manchester Airport in Cheshire, England.

History

The station was opened in 1909 with the construction of the line from Wilmslow to Manchester London Road (now Piccadilly).

It won numerous best-kept station garden awards in the 1940s and 1950s under stationmasters Mott, Hilton and Jackson. The garden is long abandoned, but there were plans to uncover and restore some of it in spring 2011.

A petition was created to seek a resumption of a morning commuter service to Manchester and daytime services to serve HMP Styal and National Trust Styal and local residents.

The station is on Station Road, 110 metres from the edge of the National Trust Quarry Bank Mill/Styal Estate and 600 metres from Styal Women's Prison and Young Offenders Institute.

Services
Styal enjoyed a half-hourly service in each direction until the mid-1990s. The construction of the airport rail link in 1993 saw services reduced with only 8 trains per day in each direction on Monday to Saturday. On Sundays there was a two hourly service in each direction. This was gradually reduced down to a skeletal Monday - Saturday service and no Sunday service. Improvements started to reappear from December 2008 following the West Coast upgrade programme.

Since May 2018, a major timetable revamp has seen the station gain an hourly service 7 days a week in both directions.

Services were temporarily suspended in summer 2020 and again in early 2021 due to amended timetables as a result of the coronavirus pandemic. Monday - Sunday services have been reinstated.

Further reading

References

External links

  Friends of Styal Station website Giving news and history : access to petition
 Crewe-Manchester Community Rail Partnership

Railway stations in Cheshire
DfT Category F1 stations
Former London and North Western Railway stations
Railway stations in Great Britain opened in 1909
Northern franchise railway stations
Railway station